Patrik Fišer (born 11 April 2000) is a Czech footballer who plays as a right midfielder.

Career

Club career
Fišer got his professional debut for FK Baník Sokolov on 24 March 2018 against FC MAS Táborsko in the Czech National Football League. He started on the bench, before replacing Stanislav Vávra in the 79th minute. This was his only appearance in that season. He didn't play for the first team again until the 2019–20 season, where he made four appearances, before he in January 2020 was loaned out to FK Ostrov. In the summer 2020, he returned to Baník, who meanwhile had been relegated to the Bohemian Football League.

Without any official confirmations, it seemed that Fišer left Baník Sokolov after the 2021-22 season.

References

External links
 

Living people
2000 births
Association football midfielders
Czech footballers
Czech National Football League players
Bohemian Football League players
FK Baník Sokolov players